Greg Tait is an Indigenous Australian actor, and musician. He is also a former policeman who sits on some Indigenous committees. His acting credits include the role of Texas in the award winning 2011 film, Mad Bastards, Satellite Boy and a recurring role in the series Firebite.

Background
Originally from Halls Creek in the East Kimberley, Western Australia, he is an established singer on the Kimberley Country Music scene. His debut album was Silver Stallion. Up until his acting debut, he had a long career as a policeman. He had no real acting experience, but Mad Bastards' director Brendan Fletcher who was looking for a larger than life character came across him and selected him for the role. Tait took time off his law enforcement job to work with Fletcher.

Leaving school at the age of 12, he spent time in and out of jail and ended up with a criminal record. Fathering a child at 18, he ended up joining the Army Reserves which put him in a different direction. At 21, he was an Aboriginal Police Liaison Officer. He gave up drinking in 1990. As a policeman, he has had to lock up close family members including his sister and brother. He was a policeman for 17 years in Western Australia. He was interviewed by Deadly Vibe magazine regarding his life experiences and the role in the film.

He is a senior member of the Ngarrawanji native title claim group. He is also the vice-president of The Kimberley Stolen Generation Aboriginal Corporation  (KSGAC).

Film work
Playing the burly local policeman in Mad Bastards which is set in a small Kimberley town, he tries to keep the peace with locals as well as within his own family. He also forms a men's group. In the film, he is the grandfather of the boy Bullet who is being sought out by his father TJ (played by Dean Daley-Jones). The grandson is in trouble so rather than send him to detention, he sends him to a camp for a couple of weeks. Texas and TJ eventually have a physical confrontation.

He had a role in the film, Satellite Boy which also starred David Gulpilil, Cameron Wallaby, Joseph Pedley and Dean Daley-Jones.

He played the role of Smokey in the Australian series Firebite which ran from 2021 to 2022.

Filmography

Further reading
 Deadly Vibe, July 25th, 2011 Second Chance – Greg Tait
 The Sydney Morning Herald, April 26, 2011 - Wild, wild west - Garry Maddox

References

External links

Living people
Australian male television actors
21st-century Australian male actors
Indigenous Australian male actors
Indigenous Australians from Western Australia
Australian police officers
Year of birth missing (living people)